Joe Delucci's is a frozen dessert company based in the United Kingdom, producing Italian gelato, ice cream and sorbet. Initially supplying a range of twenty flavours to the UK food service industry, the company opened its first retail store in Leamington Spa in 2006, and now also operates franchised and company-owned outlets in Westfield London, Westfield Stratford City, Brent Cross Bluewater, Lakeside, Meadowhall Sheffield and Bullring Birmingham.

Products
Joe Delucci’s now produces over thirty different flavours of gelato, which is made with whole fruit and natural ingredients with no artificial colours, flavours or preservatives. Unlike ice cream, gelato’s density ingredients requires a slightly higher serving temperature, aiming for a point between firm and hard, soft but not melting. The company supplies gelato to the food service industry through national companies such as Brakes.

Name
The name Joe Delucci is a fictional name. The rough translation means 'Joe of Light' and is a reference to the company's stated aim to change how consumers in the UK perceive ice cream by showing them 'the ice cream light'.  Joe Delucci's gelato isn't ice cream as most people know it, rather, it is genuine Italian Gelati and Sorbetti.

Awards
Awards won by the company include: 
Quality Food Awards 2014 - Ice Cream Winner: Tesco Finest Sicilian Mandarin Sorbetto 
Quality Food Awards 2014 - Ice Cream Highly Commended: Tesco Finest Sicilian Italian Hazelnut Gelato 
Quality Food Awards 2014 - Ice Cream Highly Commended: Tesco Finest Lombardy Mascarpone Gelato  
Great Taste Gold Awards 2012 -  Strawberry Sorbet and Dulche de Leche (Caramel Toffee) 
Quality Food Awards 2011 – Short List - Joe Delucci’s Sicilian Pistachio Gelato 
Quality Food Awards 2010 - Highly Commended - Joe Delucci's Passionfruit Gelato
IFEX 2008 - Winner of Best Grocery Product - New Products of the Show Awards

References

External links
Joe Delucci's Official Website

Retail companies established in 2005
Ice cream brands
Companies based in Warwickshire